Haldalshøgdi  is a mountain located in Hol in Buskerud, Norway.

External links
Map of Haldalshøgdi

Hol
Mountains of Viken